Margaret Coel (born October 11, 1937, in Denver, Colorado) is an American historian and mystery writer who lives in Boulder, Colorado. Coel is a fourth-generation Coloradan and grew up in Denver. She graduated in journalism from Marquette University in 1960 and worked on the Boulder Daily Camera. Coel has received six Colorado Book Awards and one WILLA Literary Award.

Wind River Mysteries 
This series—20 books published from 1995 to 2016—is set in Wyoming's Wind River Reservation and adjacent towns. The story lines are based on actual crimes and injustices. Vicky Holden, an Arapaho lawyer, and Father John O'Malley, a Jesuit priest, collaborate to solve these crimes and rectify these injustices.

Works

 Chief Left Hand.  University of Oklahoma Press,  Norman, Oklahoma, 1988. .
 Goin' Railroading: Two Generations of Colorado Stories as told by Sam Speas.  University of Oklahoma Press,  Norman, Oklahoma, 1985. /978-0-87081-497-6.
 The Eagle Catcher. A Vicky Holden, Father John O'Malley book. 1995
 The Ghost Walker. A Vicky Holden,  Father John O’Malley book. 1996
 The Dream Stalker. A Vicky Holden, Father John O'Malley book. 1997
 The Story Teller.  A Vicky Holden,  Father John O’Malley book.  1998
 The Lost Bird.  A Vicky Holden,  Father John O’Malley book.  1999
 The Spirit Woman.  A Vicky Holden,  Father John O’Malley book.  2000
 The Thunder Keeper.  A Vicky Holden,  Father John O’Malley book.  2001
 The Shadow Dancer.  A Vicky Holden,  Father John O’Malley book.  2002
 Killing Raven. A Vicky Holden, Father John O'Malley book. 2003
 Wife of Moon. A Vicky Holden, Father John O'Malley book. 2004
 Eye of Wolf. A Vicky Holden, Father John O'Malley book. 2005
 The Drowning Man.  A Vicky Holden,  Father John O’Malley book.  2006
 The Girl with Braided Hair. A Vicky Holden, Father John O'Malley book. 2007
 Blood Memory.  A Catherine McLeod book.  2008
 The Silent Spirit. A Vicky Holden, Father John O'Malley book. 2009
 The Spider's Web. A Vicky Holden, Father John O'Malley book. 2010
 The Perfect Suspect. A Catherine McLeod book. 2011
 Buffalo Bill's Dead Now. A Vicky Holden,  Father John O’Malley book.  2012
 Killing Custer. A Vicky Holden, Father John O'Malley book. 2013
 Night of the White Buffalo. A Vicky Holden, Father John O'Malley book. 2014
 The Man Who Fell from the Sky. A Vicky Holden, Father John O'Malley book. 2015
 Winter's Child. A Vicky Holden, Father John O'Malley book. 2016, final book in the Wind River Reservation series.

References

External links
 Author's home page Accessed 10 March 2017.

1937 births
Living people
20th-century American novelists
21st-century American novelists
American mystery writers
American women novelists
Marquette University alumni
Novelists from Colorado
Women mystery writers
20th-century American women writers
21st-century American women writers